Hay is an English and Scottish surname shortened from the Scoto-Norman de la Haye. A common variation is Hayes, and to a lesser degree Haynes, Haines, or Hughes. Notable people with the surname Hay include:

 Alexander Hay (disambiguation), several people
 Andrew Leith Hay (1785–1862), Scottish soldier, politician and author
 Ann Hawkes Hay (1745–1785), American soldier
 Arthur Hay, several people
 Barry Hay (born 1948), Dutch musician
 Bill Hay (born 1935), Canadian ice hockey player
 Brogan Hay (born 1999), Scottish footballer
 Colin Hay (born 1953), Scottish-Australian musician
 Cody Hay (born 1983), Canadian figure skater
Daisy Hay, Professor in English Literature
 Danny Hay (born 1975), New Zealand soccer player
 David Hay (disambiguation), several people
Dennis Hay (born 1940), Scottish field hockey player and coach
Denys Hay  (1915–1994), British historian
 Douglas Hay  (1876–1967), New Zealand cricket player and administrator
 Edward Hay (disambiguation), several people
 Eliza Monroe Hay (1786–1840), American socialite 
 Elizabeth Hay (disambiguation), several people
 Elspeth Hay (born 1929/30), British sprinter
 Fernando Soto-Hay y Garcia
 Florence Hay. American baseball player
 Garry Hay (born 1977), Scottish footballer
 George Hay (disambiguation), several people
 Gilbert Hay (disambiguation), several people
 Graham Hay (born 1965), Scottish footballer (Airdrieonians)
 Harry Hay (1912–2002), American gay rights activist
Helen Scott Hay (1869–1932), American nurse
 Henry Hay (disambiguation), multiple people
 Ian Hay, pen name of John Hay Beith (1876–1952), British schoolmaster and soldier
 James Hay (disambiguation), multiple people
 Jocelyn Hay (1927–2014), British journalist
 John Hay (disambiguation), various including:
 John Hay (1838–1905), American politician
 John Hay (Henley MP) (1919–1998), British politician
 John MacDougall Hay (1879–1919), Scottish novelist
 Sir John Dalrymple-Hay, 3rd Baronet (1821–1912), British admiral
 Sir John Hay, 6th Baronet (1788–1838), British politician
 Lord John Hay (disambiguation), several people
 Kathryn Hay (born 1975), Australian politician
 Keith Hay (1917–1997), New Zealand businessman
 Logan Hay (1871–1942), American lawyer, historian, and politician
 Louise Hay (1926–2017), American New Age writer
 Louise Hay (1935–1989), French-born American mathematician
 Louise Linton (née Hay) (born 1980), Scottish American actor 
 Lucy Hay, Countess of Carlisle (1599–1660), English courtier
 Marion E. Hay (1865–1933), American politician
 Mark Hay (born 1952), American marine ecologist
 Mary Garrett Hay (1857–1928), American suffragist
 Mary Hay (actress) (1901–1957), American stage and screen actress
 Mavis Doriel Hay (1894–1979), British author and craftswoman
 Merle Hay  (1896–1917), American soldier
 Millar Hay (born 1946), Scottish footballer
 Milton Hay (1817–1893), American lawyer and politician
 Oliver Perry Hay (1846–1930), American palaeontologist
 R.W. Hay (1786–1861), British public official. 
Richard Hay (born 1952), Indian politician and Member of Parliament
 Robert Hay (disambiguation), several people
 Roy Hay (horticulturalist) (1910–1989), English horticultural journalist and broadcaster
 Roy Hay (musician) (born 1961), British keyboard player
 Sir Rupert Hay (1893–1962), British Indian Army officer and administrator in British India
 Samuel Ross Hay (1865–1944), American Methodist bishop
 Udney Hay (1739–1806), American soldier, politician
 Trevor Hay (1945–2016), Australian chess master
 Walter Hay (fl 1920s/30s), Scottish footballer
 Wellington Hay (1864–1932), Canadian politician
 Will Hay (1888–1949), British comic actor
 William Hay (disambiguation), several people

As aristocratic Scottish family name (see Clan Hay):
 John Hay, 1st Lord Hay of Yester (c. 1450 – 1508)
 John Hay, 2nd Lord Hay of Yester (died 1513)
 John Hay, 3rd Lord Hay of Yester (died 1543)
 John Hay, 4th Lord Hay of Yester (died 1557)
 William Hay, 5th Lord Hay of Yester (died 1586)
 William Hay, 6th Lord Hay of Yester (died 1591)  
 James Hay, 7th Lord Hay of Yester (died 1609)
 John Hay, 8th Lord Hay of Yester (1593–1653) (became Earl of Tweeddale in 1646)
 John Hay, 2nd Earl of Tweeddale (1626–1697) (became Marquess of Tweeddale in 1694)
 John Hay, 2nd Marquess of Tweeddale (1645–1713)
 Charles Hay, 3rd Marquess of Tweeddale (1670–1715)
 John Hay, 4th Marquess of Tweeddale (1695–1762)
 George Hay, 5th Marquess of Tweeddale (1758–1770)
 George Hay, 6th Marquess of Tweeddale (1700–1787)
 George Hay, 7th Marquess of Tweeddale (1753–1804)
 George Hay, 8th Marquess of Tweeddale (1787–1876)
 Arthur Hay, 9th Marquess of Tweeddale (1824–1878)
 William Montagu Hay, 10th Marquess of Tweeddale (1826–1911)
 William George Montagu Hay, 11th Marquess of Tweeddale (1884–1967)
 David George Montagu Hay, 12th Marquess of Tweeddale (1921–1979)
 Edward Douglas John Hay, 13th Marquess of Tweeddale (1947–2005)
 George Hay, 1st Earl of Kinnoull (died 1634)
 George Hay, 2nd Earl of Kinnoull (died 1644)
 George Hay, 3rd Earl of Kinnoull (died 1650)
 William Hay, 4th Earl of Kinnoull (died 1677)
 George Hay, 5th Earl of Kinnoull (died 1687)
 William Hay, 6th Earl of Kinnoull (died 1709)
 Thomas Hay, 7th Earl of Kinnoull (died 1719)
 George Henry Hay, 8th Earl of Kinnoull (1689–1758)
 Thomas Hay, 9th Earl of Kinnoull (1710–1787)
 Robert Hay-Drummond, 10th Earl of Kinnoull (1751–1804)
 Thomas Hay-Drummond, 11th Earl of Kinnoull (1785–1866)
 George Hay-Drummond, 12th Earl of Kinnoull (1827–1897)
 Archibald Hay, 13th Earl of Kinnoull (1855–1916)
 George Hay, 14th Earl of Kinnoull (1902–1938)
 Arthur Hay, 15th Earl of Kinnoull (1935–2013)
 Charles Hay, 16th Earl of Kinnoull (born 1962)
 James Hay, 1st Earl of Carlisle (1580–1636)
 James Hay, 2nd Earl of Carlisle (1612–1660)
 William Hay, 1st Earl of Erroll (died c. 1462)
 Nicholas Hay, 2nd Earl of Erroll (died 1470)
 William Hay, 3rd Earl of Erroll (died 1507)
 William Hay, 4th Earl of Erroll (died 1513)
 William Hay, 5th Earl of Erroll (died 1541)
 William Hay, 6th Earl of Erroll (c. 1521 – 1541)
 George Hay, 7th Earl of Erroll (died 1573)
 Andrew Hay, 8th Earl of Erroll (died 1585)
 Francis Hay, 9th Earl of Erroll (died 1615)
 William Hay, 10th Earl of Erroll (died 1636)
 Gilbert Hay, 11th Earl of Erroll (died 1675)
 John Hay, 12th Earl of Erroll (died 1704)
 Charles Hay, 13th Earl of Erroll (died 1717)
 Mary Hay, 14th Countess of Erroll (died 1758)
 James Hay, 15th Earl of Erroll (1726–1778)
 George Hay, 16th Earl of Erroll (1767–1798)
 William Hay, 17th Earl of Erroll (1772–1819)
 William George Hay, 18th Earl of Erroll (1801–1846)
 William Harry Hay, 19th Earl of Erroll (1823–1891)
 Charles Gore Hay, 20th Earl of Erroll (1852–1927)
 Victor Alexander Sereld Hay, 21st Earl of Erroll (1876–1928)
 Josslyn Victor Hay, 22nd Earl of Erroll (1901–1941)
 Diana Denyse Hay, 23rd Countess of Erroll (1926–1978)
 Merlin Sereld Victor Gilbert Moncreiffe, 24th Earl of Erroll (born 1948)

See also
 Hay (disambiguation)
 Clan Hay
 Haye
 Hays (disambiguation)
 Hayes (surname)
 Haynes
 De la Hay (disambiguation)

English-language surnames
Scottish surnames
Surnames of English origin
Surnames of Scottish origin

ru:Хей